Beyra is a small town in the north-central Mudug region of Somalia. It is situated between Galdogob and Galkayo, in the autonomous Puntland region. It has schools and electricity.

References
Beyra, Somalia
Administrative map of Mudug
Climate of Beyra
Satellite images of Beyra

Populated places in Mudug